Green World is a literary concept defined by critic Northrop Frye in The Anatomy of Criticism.

Green World may also refer to:
The Green World, an album by Dar Williams
Green World Ecological Farm, an ecological farm in Hsinchu, Taiwan
Green World ATP Challenger, a tennis tournament held in Pingguo, China

See also
 Another Green World an album by Brian Eno
 Green World Tourist, an album by Suicide Machines
 "O Green World", a song by Gorillaz
Greenworld, a 2010 book by Dougal Dixon
Greenworld, a planet appearing in the Spawn comics